Compuware Corporation was an American software company based in Detroit, Michigan. The company offered products aimed at the information technology (IT) departments of large businesses, and its services also included testing, development, automation and performance management software for programs running on mainframe computer systems.

History

In 1973, Peter Karmanos Jr., Thomas Thewes, and Allen B. Cutting established Compuware Corporation to provide clients with professional technical services. By 1978, Compuware opened its first remote office to service the Washington, D.C., and Baltimore area. In 1992, Compuware completed its initial public offering (IPO) and traded on the NASDAQ under the symbol CPWR. At the end of 1998, Compuware surpassed the US$1 billion revenue mark. 

In 2003, Compuware relocated their headquarters from Farmington Hills, Michigan to a new headquarters building in downtown Detroit.

In November 2014, the company's headquarters building was sold to a joint venture of Dan Gilbert's real estate group Bedrock Real Estate and Meridian Health for $142 million, and renamed One Campus Martius. Later that year in December, Compuware was acquired by private equity firm Thoma Bravo for approximately $2.5 billion, becoming a privately held company. In the years that followed, the company experienced a period of growth and reinvention of mainframe software.

In March 2020, Compuware was acquired by BMC Software for $2 billion. Compuware ceased to exist as a company, but all Compuware products remain available under the name BMC Compuware, and BMC maintains Compuware's former office in Detroit.

In October 2022, it was announced that BMC's Detroit office will be moving back to the suburbs, relocating from One Campus Martius downtown to the Southfield Town Center in nearby Southfield.

Operations

Integrations and Partnerships 
Since 2014, Compuware (later BMC Compuware) has forged multiple integrations and partnerships.

 AppDynamics
 Amazon Web Services
 Atlassian JIRA
 ASG
 CloudBees
 Dynatrace
 Elastic
 Jenkins
 Parasoft
 SonarSource
 Splunk
 Syncsort
 XebiaLabs

Compuware Acquisitions 
Compuware made the following acquisitions after going private in 2014, through its acquisition by BMC in 2020:

 ISPW in January 2016
 Itgrations in October 2016
 Standard ware in December 2016
 MVS Solutions in January 2017
 XATester in July 2018
 INNOVATION Data Processing in January 2020

Products 
All Compuware products remain available under the BMC Compuware product line.
Abend-AID - Mainframe application failure resolution
Application Audit – Monitors and records all user behavior data to maintain security compliance for mainframe applications
COPE - IMS virtualization to deploy multiple virtual IMS development or testing environments
File-AID - Mainframe file and data editor/manipulator
Hiperstation - Mainframe load testing
ISPW - Mainframe Source Code Management and Continuous Integration/Continuous Delivery
Storage Backup and Recovery - Manages backup and recovery of data and optimizes performance through resource utilization monitoring
Storage Migration – Manages data migrations and erasure requirements while allowing continuous access
Storage Performance – Optimizes storage performance and capacity
Strobe – Finds an analyzes inefficiencies in mainframe applications
Thru Put Manager - Batch automation to balance batch workload
Topaz - Data and Application Analysis and Testing capabilities with visualization in modern UI
Topaz Connect – Integrates mainframe applications with IT tools used to manage non-mainframe applications
Topaz for Enterprise Data – Provides access and data visualization for both mainframe and non-mainframe data
Topaz for Program Analysis – Provides visualizations and analysis of interactions between mainframe applications
Topaz for Total Test – Enables immediate testing of programs and sub-programs as code is deployed
Topaz Workbench – Provides an integrated UI allowing developers to access multiple Topaz suite tools at once
Xpeditor – Interactive analysis and debugging tool for multiple program languages in mainframe environments
zAdviser – Utilizes machine learning to Identify bottlenecks and improve mainframe DevOps processes

References

External links

Companies based in Detroit
Software companies based in Michigan
American companies established in 1973
Software companies established in 1973
1973 establishments in Michigan
Development software companies
Business software companies
Software performance management
1992 initial public offerings
Companies formerly listed on the Nasdaq
2014 mergers and acquisitions
2020 mergers and acquisitions
Defunct software companies of the United States
American corporate subsidiaries